William James "Will" Sparks (born 15 March 1993) is an Australian producer and DJ from Melbourne, Australia, who is best known for his 2013 single "Bring It Back" with Joel Fletcher and his 2014 single "Ah Yeah So What!" featuring Wiley and Elen Levon.

He attended Camberwell High School and Caulfield Grammar in Melbourne, but dropped out at the end of year 11 to pursue a musical career.
His debut EP, Another Land, was released in Australia and debuted at number 35 in December 2014.

Sparks has toured America, Europe and Asia and played at festivals such as TomorrowWorld, Tomorrowland, Stereosonic and Future Music Festival.

He was named the No. 1 Australian DJ in 2014.

In January 2014, Will Sparks partnered with electronic music lifestyle brand Electric Family to produce a collaboration bracelet for which 100% of the proceeds are donated to Beyond Blue, a company that is working to reduce the impact of anxiety, depression and suicide in the community by raising awareness and understanding, empowering people to seek help, and supporting recovery, management and resilience.

In May 2014, Sparks embarked on a month long European tour. He has continued to tour Europe every year until 2020.

From August until November 2014, Sparks alongside Timmy Trumpet and Joel Fletcher toured North America as part of their Bounce Bus Tour.  Following the tour he returned home for a homecoming tour.

In September 2017, the video Spinnin Records produced for Sparks' song called "Take Me" was discovered to consist almost entirely of footage from award-winning and Oscar-nominated animated short film "Requiem for Romance" Spinnin' Records did not seek permission to use visuals from the creators of the film, including animator Jonathan Ng. While Ng's takedown notice of the YouTube clips of the music video succeeded, Spinnin' Records continued to use images from Ng's video on their website and publicity material. Ng is exploring legal options against Spinnin' Records. Sparks claimed he had no knowledge of the alleged copyright, as he only produced the music for the accompanying video.

DJ Mag Awards
Since 2015, Will Sparks has polled in the DJ Mag Top 100 DJ's poll.

Sparksmania

In 2018, Will Sparks launched his own festival, Sparksmania. Since the inaugural show, Sparksmania has been held in Adelaide and Brisbane featuring artists Marlo, Joel Fletcher, HP Boyz and Masked Wolf.

On 30 September 2021, Will Sparks announced Sparksmania's first national tour which included shows in Melbourne, Sydney, Brisbane and Adelaide in January and February 2022. Will Sparks was supported by Melbourne artists Short Round and Eric Sidey as well as Queensland's Yanzo.

On 3 June 2022, Sparksmania was brought to Gothenburg, Sweden for summerburst festival. The first ever international Sparksmania.

Discography

Albums

Extended plays

Singles

Remixes

Awards and nominations

APRA Awards
The APRA Awards are presented annually from 1982 by the Australasian Performing Right Association (APRA), "honouring composers and songwriters". They commenced in 1982.

! 
|-
| 2014 
| "Bring it Back" (Will Sparks & Joel Fletcher)
| Dance Work of the Year
| 
| 
|-

Music Victoria Awards
The Music Victoria Awards are an annual awards night celebrating Victorian music. They commenced in 2006.

! 
|-
| Music Victoria Awards of 2014
| Will Sparks
| Best Electronic Act
| 
| 
|-

See also
 List of Caulfield Grammar School people
Camberwell High School notable alumni

References

Living people
Australian DJs
Musicians from Melbourne
1993 births
Monstercat artists
Australian producers